Rokenrol is a 2002 album by the Red Elvises.

Track listing 
Odessa
Sunshine (in English)
Natasha Loves Reggae
Guitarist
Pilorama
Superment
Juliet (in English)
I Want You
On Wings of Love
Besbashenni Muson
Moscow
Let Them Talk
Paravos

All songs in Russian except where noted.

Red Elvises albums
2002 albums